Janice Margaret "Jan" Graveson (born 1965 in Easington, County Durham) is an English actress and singer. She is best known for her roles in Eastenders as Disa O'Brien and Benidorm as Susie .

Career
An actress who had dreams from an early age. She aspired to get to the top. Graveson never attended any acting schools as her parents could not afford to send her there, so all she learnt she did so by asking and doing. From the age of 7 she attended dance class. By 12 years she won the British Tap Dancing Championships and English Tap Dancing championships, as well as becoming north east tap and song & dance winner. Graveson took her dance teachers tickets at age 18. She furthered her opportunities by moving to London to venture into TV and West End musicals and London theatre productions.

Television
Born in Easington, County Durham.
Childhood: Horden & Peterlee, County Durham
Durham New College: Drama & Theatre Arts /  Art A level / Music A level / English Lang A level

Born into a mining family, Graveson began performing on the club circuit at the age of six, but made her television debut in White Peak Farm in 1988. She went on to play the pregnant runaway Disa O'Brien in the BBC soap opera EastEnders from 1990 to 1991. She has also appeared in episodes of Spender (1991), Heartbeat (2001; 2007), Casualty (1989;1992;2012), The Glass Virgin (1995), Wycliffe (1998) and A Touch of Frost (1996). Graveson appeared in the BBC children's television show Byker Grove from 2004 to 2006 as Heather, the mother of Hayley Robinson (Heather Garrett). Graveson was seen in an episode of the BBC hospital drama Holby City in 2006, and in 2007 she appeared in the ITV sitcom Benidorm. She guest starred in the ITV police drama, The Bill, in 2008, and  'Doctors'.

Film
In 2005 she starred alongside Ray Winstone in Richard Hawkins' BAFTA nominated psychological thriller, Everything. Graveson played Naomi, a Soho prostitute, who was hired by Winstone's character, Richard. Instead of having sex with Naomi, Richard pays her just to talk. The film is largely a succession of dialogues between the two, intermittently broken up by events such as Richard hiding in the wardrobe to watch Naomi at work, or a backstory involving his wife and daughter, which gradually becomes more and more important. The film had a budget of just £47,500 and was filmed consecutively in Soho, London in only nine days. Graveson received much high acclaim for her performance in the film.
Graveston received Winner: Best Newcomer to Screen at Sydney Film Festival 2006 (Everything) and received outstanding reviews for the portrayal of the role "Naomi".

Indian films: Gully Boy - Zoya Akhtar / Made In Heaven / Dr. Max (Netflix) /  Shoojit Sircar (PayPal commercial).
Graveston starred in the film Elysium Hernalsiense which was shot in Vienna in 2017. This film recently won Best Feature Film at the Arthouse film Festival in Chicago (Nov 2018).

Theatre and Musical Theatre
Graveson's first major role was in Blood Brothers playing the role of Linda in London's West End (Albery and Phoenix theatres), Toronto and Broadway. On stage she has played Catherine Cookson in Tom and Catherine at the Customs House theatre in South Shields. She has also appeared in Hard Times at the Piccadilly Theatre in London's West End, and in Raving Beauties with John McArdle at the Liverpool Playhouse (1991–1992). She played Stella in Stairway to Heaven No.1 National Tour, and Helen in And a Nightingale Sang at the Octagon Theatre.
No1 Tours; Copa Cabana (Gladys), Rocky Horror Show (Magenta), Grease, Hair, Cabaret, Hard Times.

Graveson sang in bands as a teenager and later had a brief spell as a pop singer in the early '90s. In 1991 she released a cover version of the 1964 Cilla Black song "Anyone Who Had a Heart". Signed to Warner Brothers London. Graveson has also appeared in many stage plays as well as in the musical Blood Brothers playing Linda. She starred in both the West End and New York City Broadway production of the show.

In 1993–94 Graveson earned a Tony Award nomination in the "Best Performance by a Featured Actress in a Musical" category, for her role as Linda in Blood Brothers N.Y.C. Graveson has continued to perform musically. She played at the British Acoustic Festival with her band Disco Indians in July 2007. Graveson also composes her own songs and often performs live at venues. She has attained all grades up to 8 with the Royal Schools of Music on pianoforte.

Graveson started her professional stage career at the Live Theatre, Newcastle in 1983 alongside Robson Green. She also runs her own school for acting, singing and dance for adults (WOW Performing Arts) and has written thesis on for practical studies in musical theatre / theatre skills for actors wishing to sing and those wanting to pursue a life treading the boards in theatre. Her courses and workshops are innovative and unique. 
Graveson currently resides in Mumbai, London and Chicago.

References

External links

English soap opera actresses
English television actresses
Living people
English musical theatre actresses
English stage actresses
English film actresses
People from Easington, County Durham
1965 births
Actors from County Durham
Musicians from County Durham